The Huahum River is a river in southern Chile and Argentina. It drains the waters of Lácar Lake in Argentina to Pirihueico Lake in Chile. The river gives name to Huahum Pass, an international mountain pass on the border between Chile and Argentina.

Rivers of Los Ríos Region
Rivers of Neuquén Province
Rivers of Argentina
Rivers of Chile
International rivers of South America